Stranda is the administrative centre of Stranda Municipality in Møre og Romsdal county, Norway. The village is located on the western shore of the Storfjorden. This is the largest urban area in the municipality.

The village is the shopping and industry center of the municipality. It lies along Norwegian County Road 60, and there is a ferry connection to the village of Liabygda, across the fjord. Stranda Church is located in Stranda. The newspaper Sunnmøringen is published in Stranda.

Damaging waves struck as far as way as Ørskog. The waves killed 17 people. It was the first natural disaster in Norway to be reported and documented in historic time.

References

Villages in Møre og Romsdal
Stranda